The radical of an algebraic group is the identity component of its maximal normal solvable subgroup.

An algebraic group is called semisimple if its radical is trivial, i.e., consists of the identity element only. The group  is semi-simple, for example.

The subgroup of unipotent elements in the radical is called the unipotent radical, it serves to define reductive groups.

See also 

 Reductive group
 Unipotent group

References 
"Radical of a group", Encyclopaedia of Mathematics

Algebraic groups